Maquia may refer to:

Maquia: When the Promised Flower Blooms, a 2018 Japanese film
Maquia District, a district of Requena Province, Peru